The Abel Axe is an electric guitar invented by Jeff Abel from Wyoming, United States and engineered by James Jones. Made from aircraft grade T-6 Billet aluminum, its distinguishing features are the various sized holes dotting the body. All Abel Axes are made in the United States. Abel Axe has won the Emerging Manufacturer Award in the 1999 Annual Manufacturing Awards Ceremony. Mark Slaughter, leader of the band Slaughter, owned an Abel Axe.

Design 
The Abel Axe was anodized in numerous colors, including grass green, silver (clear), red, black, teal, blue, violet, gold, and multicolor. The body was small and strat-typed with a trem or fixed bridge. The body pattern was changed to slot-type from 2000 to 2001 and after 2007. The necks were manufactured by Musikraft, Inc., owned by Gulab Gidwani, from 1994 to 1996. Warmoth necks were used since 2001 and are made by Delaney Guitars since 2007. Rosewood or maple wood were used for the 22 fret necks. Some other specs are Kent Armstrong pickups, Kahler tremolo, Gotoh bridge, and Sperzel graduating, locking and tuning keys. In 2001, the holes were changed to body slots, and the body used thicker coating and brighter colors.

References 

Electric guitars
American musical instruments
American inventions